Germany competed at the 2016 Summer Paralympics in Rio de Janeiro, Brazil, from 7 September to 18 September 2016. The first places the team qualified were for four athletes in sailing events.  They also qualified athletes in archery, cycling, equestrian, paracanoeing, paratriathlon, rowing and wheelchair basketball.

Funding
One source of funding and support for Germany's Paralympic efforts through to the Rio Games is a local partnership with Allianz.

Disability classifications

Every participant at the Paralympics has their disability grouped into one of five disability categories; amputation, the condition may be congenital or sustained through injury or illness; cerebral palsy; wheelchair athletes, there is often overlap between this and other categories; visual impairment, including blindness; Les autres, any physical disability that does not fall strictly under one of the other categories, for example dwarfism or multiple sclerosis. Each Paralympic sport then has its own classifications, dependent upon the specific physical demands of competition. Events are given a code, made of numbers and letters, describing the type of event and classification of the athletes competing. Some sports, such as athletics, divide athletes by both the category and severity of their disabilities, other sports, for example swimming, group competitors from different categories together, the only separation being based on the severity of the disability.

Medalists

Archery

Jennifer Hess earned Germany a spot at the Rio Games following her performance at the 2015 World Archery Para Championships. She qualified the country after her performance in the recurve women's open event. Uwe Herter earned Germany a second spot in the  W1 men's  event.

Athletics

Men
Track & road events

Field events

Women
Track & road events

Field events

Paracanoe

Men

Women

Cycling

With one pathway for qualification being one highest ranked NPCs on the UCI Para-Cycling male and female Nations Ranking Lists on 31 December 2014, Germany qualified for the 2016 Summer Paralympics in Rio, assuming they continued to meet all other eligibility requirements.

Road 

Men

Women

Track 

Pursuit

Time trial

Equestrian

Germany were one of three nations to qualify a team for dressage via their results at the 2014 FEI World Equestrian Games, where they won the bronze medal in the team event. The country earned an additional individual slot via the Para Equestrian Individual Ranking List Allocation method following the suspension of Russia, and France Finland not using one of their allocated spots.

Team Dressage – 4 quota places

Goalball 
Germany's men enter the tournament ranked 15th in the world.

Quarterfinal

Judo 

Men

Women

Paratriathlon

Rowing

One pathway for qualifying for Rio involved having a boat have top eight finish at the 2015 FISA World Rowing Championships in a medal event.  Germany qualified for the 2016 Games under this criteria in the LTA Mixed Coxed Four event with a seventh-place finish in a time of 03:30.920.

Sailing

Germany qualified a boat for two of the three sailing classes at the Games through their results at the 2014 Disabled Sailing World Championships held in Halifax, Nova Scotia, Canada. Places were earned in the solo 2.4mR event and a crew also qualified for the three-person Sonar class.

Shooting

The first opportunity to qualify for shooting at the Rio Games took place at the 2014 IPC Shooting World Championships in Suhl. Shooters earned spots for their NPC.  Germany earned a qualifying spot at this event in the R3 – 10Mm Air Rifle Prone Mixed SH1 event as a result of the performance Natascha Hiltrop.  It was the only qualification spot Germany earned at the event.

The country sent shooters to 2015 IPC Shooting World Cup in Osijek, Croatia, where Rio direct qualification was also available.  They earned a qualifying spot at this event based on the performance of Norbert Nau in the R1 – 10mAir Rifle Standing Men SH1 event.

The third opportunity for direct qualification for shooters to the Rio Paralympics took place at the 2015 IPC IPC Shooting World Cup in Sydney, Australia.  At this competition, Joseph Neumaier earned a qualifying spot for their country in the R1 - Men's 10m Air Rifle Standing SH1  event.

The last direct qualifying event for Rio in shooting took place at the 2015 IPC Shooting World Cup in Fort Benning in November. Bernhard Fendt earned a qualifying spot for their country at this competition in the R6- Mixed 50m Rifle Prone SH1 event. Elke Seeiger gave Germany their last direct qualification spot for the Rio Games in shooting with her performance in the R8 - Women's 50m Rifle 3 Positions event.

Sitting volleyball 

By finishing as runners-up in the European championship in Warendorf, Germany, Germany men's national sitting volleyball team qualified for the 2016 Summer Paralympics as Bosnia and Herzegovina men's national sitting volleyball team had already qualified for Rio.

Men 

Classification 5th / 6th

Swimming 

The top two finishers in each Rio medal event at the 2015 IPC Swimming World Championships earned a qualifying spot for their country for Rio. Daniela Schulte earned Germany a spot after winning silver in the Women's 100m Freestyle S11.

Men

Women

Table tennis 

Men

Women

Wheelchair basketball

Men
The Germany men's national wheelchair basketball team has qualified for the 2016 Rio Paralympics.

Group stage

Quarterfinal

Women
The Germany women's national wheelchair basketball team has qualified for the 2016 Rio Paralympics. As hosts, Brazil got to choose which group they were put into.  They were partnered with Algeria, who would be put in the group they did not chose.  Brazil chose Group A, which included Canada, Germany, Great Britain and Argentina.  Algeria ended up in Group B with the United States, the Netherlands, France and China.

Group stage

Quarterfinal

Semifinal

Gold medal match

Wheelchair fencing 

Men

Women

Wheelchair tennis 
Katharina Krüger qualified for Rio in the women's singles event.

Women

See also
Germany at the 2016 Summer Olympics

References

Nations at the 2016 Summer Paralympics
2016
2016 in German sport